Steve Zampieri (born 4 June 1977 in Arbon) is a Swiss former professional road bicycle racer. His sporting career began with VC Littoral.

Major results

2000
 1st Prix d'Armorique
 1st Overall Another Dam Race
1st Stage 1
2001
 1st  National Hill-Climb Championships
 1st Tour du Lac Léman
 1st GP Lausanne
 4th Tour du Jura
2002
 1st  Mountains classification, Tour de Suisse
2003
 3rd Overall Settimana Ciclista Lombarda
 4th Stausee Rundfahrt
2004
 1st  National Hill-Climb Championships
 10th Overall Tour de Romandie
2005
 9th GP du canton d'Argovie
2006
 1st  National Hill-Climb Championships
 5th Road race, National Road Championships

Grand Tour general classification results timeline

References

External links 
Profile at Cofidis official website 

1977 births
Living people
People from Arbon
Swiss male cyclists
Sportspeople from Thurgau